Hartmaniella is a genus of flowering plants belonging to the family Caryophyllaceae.

Its native range is Western USA. It was separated from Pseudostellaria in 2017.

Species:

Hartmaniella oxyphylla 
Hartmaniella sierrae

References

Caryophyllaceae
Caryophyllaceae genera